The Kieger AK3 is conventionally laid out single engine, tractor configuration, low wing two seat light aircraft built in France from 2006.  At least two have flown.

Design and development
The AK3 is the third two-seat, single engine, low wing design from André Kieger.  It is produced by Junkers Profly France and is alternatively known as the Junkers Profly Junka UL.  The wing has a single spar with a plywood leading edge and a false spar for the mounting of ailerons and flaps. Production aircraft have small winglets.  Each wing is fixed to the fuselage with a pair of sailplane style pins for rapid demounting.  The fuselage is built around four longerons, giving it a square lower section; the upper fuselage is rounded and merges into the line of the large perspex canopy over the side-by-side seating. The tailplane is mounted on top of the fuselage and the fin is swept; both are plywood structures.  There are horn balances on elevators and rudder.

The AK3 is powered by a 58.8 kW (78.9 hp) Rotax 912 UL four cylinder horizontally opposed engine, housed in the nose under a carbon fibre cowling and driving a three blade propeller.  It has a tricycle undercarriage, with glass/carcon fibre laminate cantilever spring main legs mounted onto the fuselage and a trailing link nose wheel on a forward angled cantilever leg. The mainwheels have hydraulic brakes and all wheels are faired.

Operational history
The AK3 had its first public showing at the Blois RSA meeting in August 2006. By then it had flown for more than 10 hours.  At that time production by Junkers Profly was planned at three a month; one at least had been built by the end of 2007 but current rates are unclear.

The aircraft is marketed as the Junkers Profly France Junka UL.

Specifications

References

External links
Official website

2000s French sport aircraft
Single-engined tractor aircraft
Aircraft first flown in 2006